Schynige Platte is a railway station that is the upper terminus of the Schynige Platte railway, a rack railway that connects Wilderswil with the Schynige Platte mountain in the Bernese Oberland region of Switzerland. The Schynige Platte alpine botanical garden is accessed from the station, whilst a mountain hotel and restaurant is nearby.

Administratively, the station is in the municipality of Gündlischwand in the canton of Bern.

The station is served by the following passenger trains:

References

External links 
 

Railway stations in the canton of Bern
Bernese Oberland Railway stations